Tom Wark is an American wine blogger, a public relations professional in the California wine industry, and founder of the American Wine Blog Awards.

Career
In 2011 Wark's blog was named Best Industry Wine Blog and Best Overall Wine Blog at the Wine Blog Awards in Charlottesville, VA. In 2014 Wark's blog won Best Industry/Business Blog at the Wine Blog Awards held in Santa Barbara, California.

He has been described by Mike Steinberger as the wine world's first wine muckraker, using his blog "to expose the absurdity of america’s three-tiered distribution system and the money politics that perpetuates it". His blogging may explore interstate wine shipping laws, restrictions on what is allowed to be labeled champagne or “old vines”, or feature interviews other wine bloggers, though some find its appeal in its unpredictability.

Wark is also executive director of the National Association of Wine Retailers (NAWR), a role which has positioned him in a public dispute with the Wine and Spirits Wholesalers of America (WSWA) over the three-tier alcohol distribution system.

In 2013 Wark become one of the founders of the American Wine Consumer Coalition, a national organization that advocates on behalf of the rights of wine consumers.

See also
List of wine personalities

References

 Tom Wark bio appellationamerica.com

Footnotes

External links
Tom Wark's Fermentation: The Daily Wine Blog

Year of birth missing (living people)
Living people
Wine critics